Marion Lorne MacDougal or MacDougall (sources differ) (August 12, 1883 – May 9, 1968), known professionally as Marion Lorne, was an American actress on stage, film, and television. After a career in theatre in New York and London, Lorne made her first film in 1951, and for the remainder of her life played small roles in films and television. Her recurring role as Aunt Clara in the comedy series Bewitched, between 1964 and her death in 1968, brought her widespread recognition, and she was posthumously awarded an Emmy Award for Outstanding Supporting Actress in a Comedy Series.

Early life and education
Lorne was born in West Pittston, Pennsylvania, a small mining town halfway between Wilkes-Barre and Scranton. She was the daughter of William Lorne MacDougall, MD, and his wife, Jane Louise (née Oliver), known as "Jennie". She was born in 1883 (although by the 1920s, she had shaved five years off of her age). While her year of birth is listed as 1885 in some sources, including the date inscribed on her urn (which appears to be erroneous), it was usually listed as 1888 when she was alive. The 1900 United States Census (enumerated in June 1900) gives her age as 16, and along with the Social Security Death Index (SSDI), lists her year of birth as 1883. Her parents were Scottish and English immigrants. She had a younger brother, Lorne Taylor MacDougall (October 20, 1893 – September 5, 1943). She studied at the American Academy of Dramatic Arts in New York City.

Career
Lorne debuted on Broadway in 1905; she also acted in London theaters, enjoying a flourishing stage career on both sides of the Atlantic Ocean. In London, she had her theater, the Whitehall, where she had top billing in plays written by Walter C. Hackett, her husband. None of her productions at the Whitehall had runs shorter than 125 nights.

After appearing in a few Vitaphone shorts, including Success (1931) starring Jack Haley, she made her feature-film debut in her late 60s in Strangers on a Train (1951), directed by Alfred Hitchcock.

In the early days of TV, from 1952 until 1955 Lorne had a regular role as perpetually confused junior high school English teacher Mrs. Gurney on Mister Peepers.

From 1957 to 1958, she co-starred with Joan Caulfield in the NBC sitcom Sally in the role of an elderly widow, who happens to be the co-owner of a department store. It was cancelled after one 26-episode season. Although afraid of live television, declaring, "I'm a coward when it comes to a live [television] show", she was persuaded to appear a few times to promote the film The Girl Rush with Rosalind Russell in the mid-1950s. Between 1958 and 1964, she made regular appearances on The Garry Moore Show (1958–1962).

Her last role, as Aunt Clara in Bewitched, brought Lorne her widest fame as a lovable witch who is losing her powers due to old age (and whose spells usually end in disaster). Aunt Clara usually visited by coming down the chimney; her hobby was collecting doorknobs, and she often brought her collection with her on visits. Lorne had an extensive collection of doorknobs in real life, some of which she used as props in the series.

Death
Lorne appeared in 27 episodes of Bewitched and was not replaced after she died of a heart attack in her Manhattan apartment on May 9, 1968, aged 84, prior to the start of production of the show's fifth season. She is interred at Ferncliff Cemetery in Greenburgh, New York.

Posthumous
The producers of Bewitched decided that Lorne's character as Aunt Clara could not be replaced by another actress. (Aunt Clara was never mentioned in any subsequent Bewitched episode.)  Comedic actress Alice Ghostley was recruited to fill the gap as "Esmeralda", a different type of older witch with wobbly magic whose spells often went astray. Coincidentally, Lorne and Ghostley had appeared side-by-side as partygoers in the iconic comedy-drama film The Graduate, made the year before Lorne's death. She received a posthumous Emmy Award for Outstanding Supporting Actress in a Comedy Series for her work on Bewitched. The award was accepted by Bewitched star Elizabeth Montgomery.

Personal life
In 1911, Lorne married playwright Walter C. Hackett. They were married until his death in 1944. The couple had no children.

Filmography and television work

Theatre work
 Dance Me a Song as Grandmother (January 20, 1950 – February 18, 1950)
 Harvey as Veta Louise Simmons (November 1, 1944 – January 15, 1949)
 Off With The Motley (1937-1938) [Whitehall Theatre, London]
 London After Dark (1937) [Streatham Hill Theatre]
 London After Dark (1937) [Apollo Theatre, London]
 The Fugitives (1936) [Whitehall Theatre, London]
 Espionage (1935-1936) [Apollo Theatre, London]
 Afterwards (1933) [Whitehall Theatre, London]
 The White Sisters (1933) [Whitehall Theatre, London]
 The Gay Adventure (1932) [Whitehall Theatre, London]
 Road House (1932) [Whitehall Theatre, London]
 Take a Chance (1931)  [Whitehall Theatre, London]
 Captain Applejack (1931) [Whitehall Theatre, London]
 Good Losers (1931) [Whitehall Theatre, London]
 It Pays to Advertise (1930-1931)
 Hyde Park Corner (1930)
 The Freedom of the Seas (1929)
 Sorry You've Been Troubled (1929)
 Regeneration (1928)
 Other Men's Wives (1928)
 The Wicked Earl (1928) [His Majesty's Theater, London]
 The Barton Mystery (1927)
 77 Park Lane (1927)
 77 Rue Chalgrin (1925)
 Ambrose Applejohn's Adventure (1921-1923) [Criterion Theatre, London]
 Mr. Todd's Experiment (1920)
 The Barton Mystery (October 13–30, 1917; 20 performances)
 It Pays to Advertise (1915-1916)
 Don't Weaken (January 1914)
 The Little Minister as Lady Babbie (June 22, 1910 - 1910) [Hunter-Bradford Players at the Parsons Theater]
 The Florist Shop as Angelica Perkins (August 9, 1909 - September 1909)
 The Devil as Mimi (August 18, 1908 - November 1908)
 Here Tonight (1908)
 Mrs. Temple's Telegram (February 1, 1905 - March 27, 1905)

Awards and nominations

See also

 List of American film actresses
 List of American television actresses
 List of Americans of English descent
 List of people from New York City
 List of people from Pennsylvania
 List of Primetime Emmy Award winners
 List of Scottish Americans

References

External links
 
 
 
 Marion Lorne in 1914 with Wallace Worsley later a famous film director (City Museum of New York)
I've Got A Secret! - Marion Lorne 11/25/1959

1883 births
Age controversies
1968 deaths
19th-century American actresses
20th-century American actresses
Actresses from New York City
Actresses from Pennsylvania
American film actresses
American stage actresses
American television actresses
American people of English descent
American people of Scottish descent
Burials at Ferncliff Cemetery
People from Luzerne County, Pennsylvania
Outstanding Performance by a Supporting Actress in a Comedy Series Primetime Emmy Award winners
American Academy of Dramatic Arts alumni